Lucas Ezequiel Salas (born 28 September 1994) is an Argentine professional footballer who plays as a midfielder.

Career

Club
Salas played for the San Martín youth team either side of a spell with Alianza. He began his senior career with San Martín, with his debut arriving during a Copa Argentina match with Sarmiento in November 2011. Salas' first appearance in professional league football came on 11 August 2012, he featured for the final thirty-three minutes of a home defeat to Colón. In his opening two campaigns with the club, Salas made five appearances in all competitions. In his third season, he was selected for thirty-one fixtures; netting his first goal in the process, in a 1–1 draw with Villa San Carlos on 8 September 2013.

After not featuring in the Argentine Primera División during 2016–17 or 2017–18, Salas terminated his contract with the club in May 2018. Two months later, he completed a move to Greek football by joining Asteras Tripolis.

International
In 2012, Salas was selected as part of Julio Olarticoechea's squad for a Four Nations Tournament in Chile. He won one cap, against Mexico on 9 October.

Career statistics
.

References

External links

1994 births
Living people
People from San Juan, Argentina
Argentine footballers
Argentina youth international footballers
Argentina under-20 international footballers
Association football midfielders
Argentine expatriate footballers
Expatriate footballers in Greece
Argentine expatriate sportspeople in Greece
Argentine Primera División players
Primera Nacional players
San Martín de San Juan footballers
Asteras Tripolis F.C. players
Olimpo footballers
Sportivo Desamparados footballers
Sportspeople from San Juan Province, Argentina